Youcef Zighoud ( February 18, 1921 – September 25, 1956), also known as Colonel Si Ahmed, was an Algerian FLN party fighter during the Algerian War. On August 20, 1955, he planned an attack against the French occupation in Philippeville (currently called Skikda) and surroundings  commonly referred to as the Battle of Philippeville. The attack led to harsh crackdown and repression by the French government. While numbers are disputed, the conflict resulted in between 1,239 and 12,000 deaths. Zighoud, from whom the town of Zighoud Youcef takes its name, was killed in Sidi Mezghiche during a clash with the French Army.

Biography 

Zighoud attended the Quranic school after leaving a French primary school.

At the age of 17, Zighoud joined the Algerian People Party (PPA), becoming a local official in Smendou in 1938. After being elected in the Movement of Triumph of Democratic Liberties (MTLD) in 1947, he took part of the Special Organization (OS), which was called to prepare all essential requirements to the Armed Struggle, after the total fail of the Pacific way. Arrested in 1950 by French Colonial Police after discovering the (OS), he was sued and thrown in jail in Annaba, from which he escaped. He also engaged the military action of Unity and Working Revolutionary Committee (CRUA) since its creation.

On November 1, 1954 he was with Didouche Mourad, in the North Constantine area that became Wilaya II in the Armée de libération nationale (ALN). Youcef Zighoud took part in the Oued Boukerker's battle with Mourad on January 18, 1955, in which Mourad was killed. Youcef Zighoud took his place at the head of Wilaya II.

In this role, he organized and directed the famous August 20, 1955 Battle of Philippeville, referred to as “the bloodbath of Constantine region,” which was firmly condemned by the FLN head command. A year after, on August 20, 1956, he took part the Soummam congress where all organic and political structures of November's revolution were set up.

Zighoud, who was one of the congress's founders, was appointed a member of National Council of the Algerian Revolution (CNRA), was promoted to colonel of National Liberation Army (ALN) and assumed command of Wilaya II. Soon after, he joined again his battle station and started applying Congress decisions.

On September 25, 1956, Zighoud was killed during an explicative and organizational tour of his units by a French Army ambush in Sidi Mezghiche (Wilaya of Skikda) at the age of 35.

See also
 Declaration of 1 November 1954

1921 births
1956 deaths
Algerian Muslims
People of the Algerian War
Algerian revolutionaries